Hulta may refer to:
 Hulta, Blekinge
 Hulta, Kronoberg
 Hulta, Jönköping
 Hulta, Kalmar
 Hulta, Östergötland 
 Hulta, Örebro
 Hulta, Värmland
 Hulta, Västra Götaland